The following squads were named for the 1972 Summer Olympics tournament.

Brazil 

Head coach: Antoninho

Burma 

Head coach: U Sein Hlaing

Colombia 

Head coach:  Todor Veselinovic

Denmark 

Head coach:  Rudi Strittich

East Germany 

Head coach: Georg Buschner

Ghana 

Head coach: Charles Gyamfi

Hungary 

Head coach: Rudolf Illovszky

Iran

Head coach: Mahmoud Bayati

Malaysia 

Head coach: Jalil Che Din

Mexico 

Head coach: Diego Mercado

Morocco 

Head coach:  Sabino Barinaga

Poland 

Head coach: Kazimierz Górski

Sudan 

Head coach: Abdel-Fatah Hamad

United States

Head coach: Bob Guelker

Soviet Union 

Head coach: Aleksandr Ponomarev

West Germany 

Head coach: Jupp Derwall

References

External links
 FIFA pages on 1972 Olympic football tournament

Squads
1972 Summer Olympics